Theistic rationalism is a hybrid of natural religion, Christianity, and rationalism, in which rationalism is the predominant element.
According to Henry Clarence Thiessen, the concept of theistic rationalism first developed during the eighteenth century as a form of English and German Deism.
The term "theistic rationalism" occurs as early as 1856, in the English translation of a German work on recent religious history.
Some scholars have argued that the term properly describes the beliefs of some of the prominent  Founding Fathers of the United States, including George Washington, John Adams, Benjamin Franklin, James Wilson, and Thomas Jefferson.

Definition
Theistic rationalists believe natural religion, Christianity, and rationalism typically coexist compatibly, with rational thought balancing the conflicts between the first two aspects. They often assert that the primary role of a person's religion should be to bolster morality, a fixture of daily life.

Theistic rationalists believe that God plays an active role in human life, rendering prayer effective.
They accept parts of the Bible as divinely inspired, using reason as their criterion for what to accept or reject.
Their belief that God intervenes in human affairs and their approving attitude toward parts of the Bible distinguish theistic rationalists from Deists.

Anthony Ashley-Cooper, 3rd Earl of Shaftesbury (1671–1713), has been described as an early theistic rationalist.  According to Stanley Grean,

Moral Law
Moral law of Theistic Rationalism chooses the highest good of being in general. It accepts, as a first truth of reason, that Man is a subject of moral obligation. Men are to be judged by their motives, that is, by their designs, intentions.
If a man intend evil, though, perchance, he may do us good, we do not excuse him, but hold him guilty of the crime which he intended. So if he intends to do us good, and, perchance, do us evil, we do not, and cannot condemn him. He may have been to blame for many things connected with the transaction, but for a sincere, and of course hearty endeavour to do us good, he is not culpable, nor can he be, however it may result. If he honestly intended to do us good, it is impossible that he should not have used the best means in his power, at the time: this is implied in honesty of intention. And if he did this, reason cannot pronounce him guilty, for it must judge him by his intentions. Courts of criminal law have always in every enlightened country assumed this as a first truth. They always inquire into the quo animo, that is, the intention, and judge accordingly.
The universally acknowledged truth that lunatics are not moral agents and responsible for their conduct, is but an illustration of the fact that the truth we are
considering, is regarded, and assumed, as a first truth of reason.
Moral law is a pure and simple idea of the reason. It is the idea of perfect, universal, and constant consecration of the whole being, to the highest good of being. Just this is, and nothing more nor less can be, moral law; for just this, and nothing more nor less, is a state of heart and a course of life exactly suited to the nature and relations of moral agents, which is the only true definition of moral law.
Thus, whatever is plainly inconsistent with the highest good of the universe is illegal, unwise, inexpedient, and must be prohibited by the spirit of moral law.

Civil and family governments are indispensable to the securing of this end.

References

External links
 "Gouverneur Morris, Theistic Rationalist", Gregg L. Frazer
 "Conyers Middleton, Progenitor of Theistic Rationalism", Jonathan W. Rowe
 "The Definition of Theistic Rationalism, Dispatches from the Creation Wars", Ed Brayton

Christian philosophy
Rationalism
Religious naturalism
Rational